Hairy mistletoe is a common name for several plants and may refer to:

Erianthemum dregei, native to Africa
Phoradendron capitellatum, native to Arizona, New Mexico, Chihuahua and Sonora
Phoradendron leucarpum, native to much of North America
Phoradendron tomentosum, native to Texas, Oklahoma, Louisiana and Mississippi